Triplochiton scleroxylon is a tree of the genus Triplochiton of the family Malvaceae. The timber is known by the common names African whitewood, abachi, obeche (in Nigeria), wawa (in Ghana), ayous (in Cameroon) and sambawawa (in Ivory Coast). The tree is the official state tree of Ekiti State, Nigeria.

Description
The species is distributed over the tropical areas of West Africa and Central Africa.

Uses

The timber yielded is typically pale yellow and is moderately soft and light for a hardwood.

The timber is used in the manufacture of veneer, furniture, picture frames and mouldings. It is also used by guitar makers. Gibson and Fender Japan have used the wood to produce limited edition guitars.

The tree is a host of the African silk moth, Anaphe venata, whose caterpillars feed on the leaves and spin cocoons which are then used to make silk.

The wood is exploited in its natural habitat, a harvest that is unsustainable in some areas. However, it remains classed as 'least concern' on the IUCN Red List.

References

scleroxylon
Trees of Africa
Flora of Cameroon
Flora of Ivory Coast
Flora of Ghana
Flora of Nigeria
Flora of Sierra Leone
Least concern plants
Wood